The Wretched is a 2019 American supernatural horror film written and directed by the Pierce Brothers. It stars John-Paul Howard, Piper Curda, Zarah Mahler, Kevin Bigley, Gabriela Quezada Bloomgarden, Richard Ellis, Blane Crockarell, Jamison Jones, and Azie Tesfai. The film follows a defiant teenage boy who faces off with an evil witch posing as the neighbor next door.

The Wretched had its world premiere at the Fantasia International Film Festival on July 19, 2019, and was released in drive-in theaters and through Premium VOD on May 1, 2020. Due to the COVID-19 pandemic limiting the amount of films in theaters, it became the first film since Avatar (2009) to top the box office for six consecutive weekends.

Plot 
In 1985, Megan arrives at the home of the Gambels to babysit their daughter Ashley. As she enters the basement she finds Ashley being eaten by an inhuman creature in the form of Mrs. Gambel. Terrified, she stumbles trying to escape, but Mr. Gambel purposely shuts the door on her. A strange sign is then etched on the door.

In the present Ben Shaw comes to live with his father Liam as his parents are in the middle of a divorce. Liam gives Ben a job working at the marina, where he befriends Mallory. During his shift, he notices Liam kissing a co-worker named Sara. In the woods, Dillon, the son of Liam's neighbor Abbie, finds a tree with the same symbol seen as that at the Gambel house. He hears what sounds like Abbie's voice coming from the tree, calling to him before Abbie appears behind him. They bring a buck home that they hit, and later that night, something crawls out of the buck's corpse.

Ben investigates strange noises he hears on the roof. He follows the sounds to Abbie's house, but all he finds is an animal. He catches a glimpse of a witch on the porch, but cannot be sure what he saw due to Abbie's husband Ty turning on the porch light. Ben befriends Dillon and makes him promise to tell Ben if he sees anything strange around his house. That night, Abbie goes to check on her infant son Sam (Dillon's younger brother) in his crib. However, she finds that he had disappeared, replaced by a bundle of sticks. She is then attacked by the witch. Ben comes home late at night and notices Abbie walking into the forest with a child.

Ben returns home late one night to find Dillon hiding in his house, claiming that there is something wrong with his mother. Abbie comes looking for Dillon, threatening Ben and attempting to get into the house. Ty comes and takes Dillon home. Dillon tells Ty that Abbie is acting weird, but Ty dismisses his concerns. Ben is also concerned that something strange is happening with Abbie. At work, Ben learns that Dillon never showed up for his sailing lesson. When he goes to Dillon's house, Ty denies that he even has a son. Later, Abbie whispers something demonic to Ty that makes his ears bleed. She then takes a shower and her body starts to decay.

Ben is suspicious and reads about a witch that is known for wearing the skins of victims and "feeding on the forgotten". He confides in Mallory, but she does not take him seriously. She slips a taunting note under Abbie's door. Ben sneaks into Abbie's cellar and finds a picture of the family with Ty's face scratched out, along with a picture of Mallory and her sister Lily. He realizes by the picture that the witch is after Lily next. He calls Mallory to warn her that Lily is in danger, but Mallory does not remember her sister. Ben rushes to save Lily, but is too late, as the witch has pulled her into her demonic, semi-underground tree. He tries to pull Lily out, but their grip  is broken and he gets knocked out after falling back and hitting his head on a rock. Upon returning home, he finds that Liam has called the police due to Ben being missing. Ben attempts to explain what is happening with the neighbors, but is accused of being on drugs. Ben confides in Sara but notices flowers decaying, and realizes she is the witch inhabiting Sara's skin.  When she tries to attack, he slashes her arm, but the witch makes it look like he attacked Sara for no reason. He is taken into custody. Ben sees Sara whispering in the officer's ear. He tells his dad that Sara is the witch and pleads with Liam to check the neighbors' cellar. Instead of taking Ben to the station, the officer attempts to drown him at the beach until a dog attacks. The officer shoots the dog and then himself as he realizes that something is controlling him to kill Ben. Meanwhile, Liam finds the dead bodies of Ty and Abbie at their house. Demonic Sara attacks Liam and is nearly about to kill him, but Ben arrives and shoots her with the officer's gun. The witch crawls out of Sara's corpse and goes after Ben, but he takes Liam to the safety of his father's car as their house burns down. When a picture of Ben and his family burns, Ben suddenly remembers that he has a little brother, Nathan, implying the witch had made Ben forget about him.

Ben and Mallory go to the tree to rescue their siblings. As Ben rescues Nathan and Lily, Liam arrives and rams his car into the witch. Unfortunately, they are too occupied with Liam's injuries to finish off the witch permanently, although they do burn her lair to the ground. Afterwards, Ben and Nathan are leaving to return to their mother's house. Liam says he will stay with his brother while he heals from the witch's attack. Ben and Mallory kiss goodbye, and she puts a flower in his hair before leaving to give sailing lessons. Ben notices the flower is fake, implying that the witch is now possessing Mallory, who is alone in the middle of the lake with three young children.

Cast

Production
Filming took place around Omena and Northport, Michigan, near the Pierces' hometown.

Composer, and childhood friend of the Pierce Brothers, Devin Burrows composed the film's score. According to Burrows in a 2020 Nightmare on Film Street interview, he visited the film's shooting locations prior to principal photography, to work the natural influence and inspiration into the music. The trio also worked together on the Pierce Brothers' 2011 film Deadheads.

Release
The film premiered at the Fantasia International Film Festival on July 19, 2019. It also screened at the Traverse City Film Festival, and at the Toronto After Dark Film Festival. It was released in selected theaters (mainly drive-ins), and through Premium VOD in the United States on May 1, 2020. The film was released in cinemas in the Netherlands on June 25, 2020.

Reception

Box office
The Wretched grossed $1.8 million in the United States and Canada, and $2.5 million in other territories, for a worldwide total of $4.3 million.

Due to limited theater exposure and few films playing due to the COVID-19 pandemic, The Wretched was #1 at the box office in its opening weekend, earning $65,908 from 12 theaters. The film finished first again the following weekend with $69,608 at 19 theaters, for a 10-day running total of $165,294. The film remained in first the following four weekends, making $91,975 from 21 drive-in theaters in its third, $215,836 from 59 in its fourth, and $181,000 from 75 in its fifth. It became the first film to top the box office five weekends in a row since Black Panther, which opened in February 2018, although it was noted that Trolls World Tour would have likely come in first over the course of its release had its weekly grosses been made public.

The film then made $207,212 from 99 theaters and crossed the $1 million mark, topping newcomer Becky by $1,415 to remain in first for the sixth straight weekend (the first film since Avatar in 2009 to do so). It was finally dethroned in its seventh weekend, finishing third, behind Becky and Infamous with $148,583.

Critical response
The website's critics consensus reads, "The Wretched stirs up a savory blend of witch-in-the-woods horror ingredients that should leave genre fans hungry for a second helping from writer-directors Brett and Drew T. Pierce." On Metacritic, the film has a weighted average score of 61 out of 100 based on 15 critic reviews, indicating "generally favorable reviews".

Jeannette Catsoulis of The New York Times gave the film a largely positive review, writing, "Blessed with shivery setups and freaky effects—here, skin-crawling is literal—The Wretched transforms common familial anxieties into flesh, albeit crepey and creeping." Geoff Berkshire of the Los Angeles Times wrote, "What the Pierce brothers lack in flavorful storytelling or compelling characters, they almost entirely make up for in good old-fashioned atmosphere and suspense. The Wretched rarely surprises, but it's well-crafted enough to get under your skin anyway, with an able assist from the creepy camerawork of cinematographer Conor Murphy and unsettling score by Devin Burrows."

Writing for RogerEbert.com, Simon Abrams gave the film 1.5 out of 4 stars, saying that "unlike Stranger Things, The Wretched is a little too cute about teen angst, and not light enough on its feet to make you want to root for its ostensibly typical adolescent."

References

External links
 

2019 films
2019 horror films
2019 independent films
2010s English-language films
2010s monster movies
2010s supernatural horror films
American independent films
American monster movies
American supernatural horror films
Films about child abduction in the United States
Films about missing people
Films about spirit possession
Films about witchcraft
Films shot in Michigan
IFC Films films
Metro-Goldwyn-Mayer films
2010s American films